Porvenir is a small town in the Nicolás Suárez Province of the Pando Department in Bolivia. It is located 33 kilometers south of Cobija, the department's capital city, at an altitude of 222 m on the left banks of Tahuamanu River, which in its later course is named Orthon River before it discharges into Beni River.

Population
The population of Porvenir has risen strongly during the past two decades to almost five-fold:

References 

Populated places in Pando Department